Denise O'Connor (born May 18, 1935) is an American former fencer. She competed for the United States in the women's team foil events at the 1964 and 1976 Summer Olympics.

She also fenced in five World Championships (1965, '66, '69, '70, '75), and the 1975 Pan American Games in which she won a bronze medal. She was coach of the Brooklyn College women's fencing team for over a decade, ultimately becoming the college’s Assistant Director of Athletics. In 1975 and 1976, she was National Intercollegiate Women's Fencing Association College Coach of the Year.

O'Connor has been a resident of Bayonne, New Jersey.

References

External links
 

1935 births
Living people
American female foil fencers
Olympic fencers of the United States
Fencers at the 1964 Summer Olympics
Fencers at the 1976 Summer Olympics
Sportspeople from Bayonne, New Jersey
Pan American Games medalists in fencing
Pan American Games bronze medalists for the United States
Brooklyn College faculty
City University of New York faculty
Fencers at the 1975 Pan American Games
American women academics
21st-century American women
Medalists at the 1975 Pan American Games